Statistics of Russian Top League in season 1993.

Teams
18 teams are played in the 1993 season. After the 1992 season, Zenit St.Petersburg, Fakel Voronezh, Kuban Krasnodar, Shinnik Yaroslavl and Dinamo-Gazovik were relegated to the 1993 Russian First League. They were replaced by Zhemchuzhina-Sochi, winners of the 1992 Russian First League.

Venues

Personnel and kits

Managerial changes

League standings

Results

Promotion tournament
FC Rostselmash and FC Asmaral were relegated. FC Krylia Sovetov, FC Luch and FC Okean played in a promotion tournament against the winners of the three zones of the 1993 Russian First League, in which three spots in 1994 Russian Top League were contested. FC Krylia Sovetov kept their spot and FC Luch and FC Okean were relegated.

Top scorers
21 goals
 Victor Panchenko (KAMAZ)

19 goals
 Oleg Veretennikov (Rotor)

18 goals
 Vladimir Beschastnykh (Spartak Moscow)

16 goals
 Igor Simutenkov (Dynamo Moscow)

14 goals
  Mikhail Markhel (Spartak Vladikavkaz)
 Nikolai Pisarev (Spartak Moscow)
  Nazim Suleymanov (Spartak Vladikavkaz)

13 goals
  Gocha Gogrichiani (Zhemchuzhina)
 Valeri Karpin (Spartak Moscow)
 /Vladimir Niederhaus (Rotor)

Medal squads
(league appearances and goals listed in brackets)

References
Russia - List of final tables (RSSSF)

Russian Premier League seasons
1
Russia
Russia